Dilyara Nassyrova, better known as Dilka Bear (born 1977 in Almaty, Kazakhstan), is a Kazakh artist, illustrator and painter.

Biography
Dilka Bear studied Architecture at the Almaty University of Arts, in Kazakhstan. After working as an illustrator and a graphic designer for companies such as Cosmopolitan Kazakhstan, Grey Central Asia, Saatchi & Saatchi Kazakhstan, she devoted herself to painting. In 2005 she moved to Trieste, where she currently lives.

Her work has been shown in galleries in Rome, Amsterdam, Los Angeles, and Melbourne.

Influences and style
Influenced by the great masters of the past, such as Bruegel and Bosch, the Italian Renaissance, but also by contemporary artists such as Marion Peck and Ray Caesar, and by Grimms' Fairy Tales, Dilka Bear mainly paints with acrylics on table and “creates beautiful […] illustrations of young girls and their frank expressions that mirrors the worlds around them”.

Her “dreamy” works – to use her own words – is often categorized as belonging to the Pop surrealism visual art movement.

Exhibitions

Group exhibitions 
 1997 “Butterflies”, Tribuna Art Gallery, Almaty, Kazakhstan
 1998 “Break 21”, International Festival of Young Artists, Ljubljana, Slovenia
 1999 “Break 21”, International Festival of Young Artists, Ljubljana, Slovenia
 1999 “The Line of Beauty”, Art Manege ’99 - Moscow, Russia
 2000 “Africa”, Soros Centre of Contemporary Art, Almaty, Kazakhstan
 2001 The Cover of Daily Routine - Stuttgarter Kunstverein, Stuttgart, Germany
 2009 “Kokeshi: from Folk to Art Toy”, Japanese American National Museum, Los Angeles, United States
 2011 “Italian Pop Surrealism”, Mondo Bizzarro, Rome
 2012 “Run Away Circus”, Auguste Clown Gallery, Melbourne, Australia
 2012 “Vanishing Point”, Auguste Clown Gallery, Melbourne, Australia
 2013 “Draw”, Auguste Clown Gallery, Melbourne, Australia
 2013 “Blue Hour”, Auguste Clown Gallery, Melbourne, Australia
 2013 “Into the Wild”, Strychnin Gallery, Berlin, Germany
 2013 “All Stars”, 10 Years Anniversary Exhibition, Strychnin Gallery, Berlin, Germany
 2013 “Kingdom of Broken Dreams: Dilka Bear & Paolo Petrangeli”, Flower Pepper Gallery, Pasadena, USA

Solo exhibitions 
 2012 “Wild Escape”, Mondo Bizzarro, Rome
 2013 “Sleepwalker’s Dreams”, Auguste Clown Gallery, Melbourne, Australia
 2014 “Forgotten Memories”, Auguste Clown Gallery, Melbourne, Australia

Bibliography
vv.aa., Italian Pop Surrealism, Rome: Mondo Bizzarro, 2012
Dilka Bear, Modena: Logos edizioni, 2013
Dilka Bear, Su Anasi, Logos edizioni, 2015

References

1977 births
Living people
Kazakhstani painters
Kazakhstani women painters
Kazakhstani illustrators
Kazakhstani women illustrators
21st-century Kazakhstani painters
21st-century Kazakhstani women
People from Almaty
Artists from Trieste
Kazakhstani comics artists
Kazakhstani female comics artists